Mary Jane Rathbun may refer to:

 Mary J. Rathbun (1860–1943), American zoologist
 Brownie Mary (1922–1999), American medical cannabis activist